The growing block universe theory of time (or the growing block view), states that the past and present both exist, and the future as yet does not. The present is an objective property, to be compared with a moving spotlight. By the passage of time more of the world comes into being; therefore, the block universe is said to be growing. The growth of the block is supposed to happen in the present, a very thin slice of spacetime, where more of spacetime is continually coming into being. Growing block theory should not be confused with block universe theory, also known as eternalism.

The growing block view is an alternative to both eternalism (according to which past, present, and future all exist) and presentism (according to which only the present exists). It is held to be closer to common-sense intuitions than the alternatives. C. D. Broad was a proponent of the theory (1923). Some modern defenders are Michael Tooley (in 1997) and Peter Forrest (in 2004).

Fabrice Correia and Sven Rosenkranz have developed their own distinctive view of this theory (2015).

The theory 
Broad first proposed the theory in 1923.  He described the theory as follows:

It will be observed that such a theory as this accepts the reality of the present and the past, but holds that the future is simply nothing at all. Nothing has happened to the present by becoming past except that fresh slices of existence have been added to the total history of the world. The past is thus as real as the present. On the other hand, the essence of a present event is, not that it precedes future events, but that there is quite literally nothing to which it has the relation of precedence. The sum total of existence is always increasing, and it is this which gives the time-series a sense as well as an order.  A moment t is later than a moment t'  if the sum total of existence at t includes the sum total of existence at t'  together with something more.

This dynamic theory of time conforms with the common-sense intuition that the past is fixed, the future is unreal, and the present is constantly changing. The theory resolves the paradox that time has a beginning but does not seem to have an end. There are also other reasons for supporting the growing block view of time that go beyond the common-sense. Tooley, for example, bases his argument on the causal relation. His main argument as outlined by Dainton is as follows:

 Events in our world are causally related.
 The causal relation is inherently asymmetrical. Effects depend on their causes in a way that causes do not depend on their effects.
 This asymmetry is only possible if a cause's effects are not real as of the time of their cause.
 Causes occur before their effects: "X is earlier than Y" means (roughly) that some event simultaneous with X causes some event simultaneous with Y.
 Our universe must, therefore, be a Growing Block.

Criticism

Recently several philosophers, David Braddon-Mitchell (2004), Craig Bourne and Trenton Merricks have noted that if the growing block view is correct then we have to conclude that we do not know whether now is now. (The first occurrence of "now" is an indexical and the second occurrence of "now" is the objective tensed property. Their observation implies the following sentence: "This part of spacetime has the property of being present".)

Take Socrates discussing, in the past, with Gorgias, and at the same time thinking that the discussion is occurring now. According to the growing block view, tense is a real property of the world so his thought is about now, the objective present. He thinks, tenselessly, that his thought is occurring on the edge of being.  But we know he is wrong because he is in the past; he does not know that now is now. But how can we be sure we are not in the same position? There is nothing special with Socrates. Therefore, we do not know whether now is now.

However, some have argued that there is an ontological distinction between the past and the present. For instance, Forrest (2004) argues that although there exists a past, it is lifeless and inactive. Consciousness, as well as the flow of time, is not active within the past and can only occur at the boundary of the block universe in which the present exists in all existence.

See also
 An Experiment with Time, which proposes a similar concept
 Eternity
 Philosophy of space and time

Notes

References

External links
 

Concepts in metaphysics
Conceptual models
Philosophy of time
Metaphysical theories